Sir George Alfred Julius (29 April 187328 June 1946) was an English-born Australian inventor and entrepreneur. He was the founder of Julius Poole & Gibson Pty Ltd and Automatic Totalisators Ltd, and invented the world's first automatic totalisator.

Early years
George Alfred Julius was born in a small house in Bethel Street, Norwich, England, (demolished in the 1930s to make way for the new City Hall). At that time his father, Churchill Julius (1847–1938), was a curate at St. Giles in Norwich. In 1873 the family moved firstly to the parishes of South Brent (now known as Brent Knoll) and thereafter to Shapwick and Ashcott in Somerset. Later, Churchill Julius became vicar of Holy Trinity, Islington, London; he subsequently accepted the appointment as Archdeacon of Ballarat, Australia, and it was here that the family travelled on the sailing ship South Australian in 1884. From an early age, George's mechanical inclination was obvious to his parents and he often helped his father to fix clocks, one of which survives (now decommissioned) in the tower at St. Michael's, Brent Knoll, although George would have been too young to have assisted with this particular repair!  The family moved to New Zealand when Churchill Julius was nominated to the Diocese of Christchurch in 1889; he was consecrated (first) Bishop of Christchurch in 1890, and made Anglican Primate and (first) Archbishop of New Zealand in 1922.

In 1890, George Julius enrolled in a BSc (Mechanical Engineering) degree course at Canterbury College. Because of the contemporary boom in railway construction, he specialised in railway engineering and was the first such engineering student to graduate from this university, at the same time as Ernest Rutherford, graduating through the University of New Zealand.

Early career and the totalisator

Julius's professional career began in 1896. He travelled to Western Australia to accept an appointment as assistant engineer on the staff of the Locomotive Department, Western Australian Government Railways. He worked for the Department for eleven years and was promoted to chief draughtsman and then engineer in charge of tests.

While working for the Government Railways, George Julius conducted a series of tests on timber and wrote two learned papers on Western Australian hardwoods. This research led to a job offer from Allen Taylor & Co Ltd, a timber company in Sydney, as part-time engineer. Julius accepted this offer in 1907.

In whatever spare time he had, George Julius worked on the design for an automatic totalisator. Helped by two of his sons, he built a prototype.  However, the automatic totalisator was not originally conceived as a betting machine, but as a mechanical vote-counting machine. When the government rejected the voting machine concept, George Julius adapted it as a racecourse totalisator. The first installation of the totalisator was at Ellerslie Racecourse, Auckland, New Zealand in 1913, which was entirely manual in operation, and the second at Gloucester Park Racetrack in Western Australia, electrically driven.  The patent was lodged on 21 December 1914.  Subsequent orders kept the firm of Julius, Poole & Gibson solvent throughout the Great Depression, with the first UK installation in 1928, for greyhound racing and in 1932 the first American installation at Hialeah Park, Florida.

Career progression
One of the great contributions made by George Julius to the advancement of Australian technology resulted from his appointment, in 1926, as chairman to the Council for Scientific and Industrial Research (CSIR). This later became the Commonwealth Scientific and Industrial Research Organisation (CSIRO), modelled on the UK's DSIR.  He lobbied for development of primary production and solution to issues in such areas as food storage and food preservation. Later, he turned his attention to issues in secondary production such as aeronautics and electronics. During World War II, he served on the Central Inventions Board, the Australian Council for Aeronautics (as chairman) and the Army Inventions Directorate.

George Julius was knighted in 1929. He remained active as a committee representative until his death on 28 June 1946.

Family and legacy
In 1898, he married Eva O'Connor (1878-1972), daughter of Charles Yelverton O'Connor. They had three sons.

The eldest, Awdry Francis Julius (born 1900), was later to become a partner in his father's firm.

Another, George Yelverton Julius, was known as "Gentleman George".  However, he brought his good upbringing into a life of crime. In 1953 he went to jail for eight years for burglary.  He was the father of Wendy Whiteley, wife of the Australian painter Brett Whiteley, and his granddaughter was Arkie Whiteley.

A third son died during a flight around Australia in a single-seater aeroplane.

A road in the grounds of the CSIRO headquarters in Canberra is named in his honour.

References

External links

 George Julius historical page.
 George Julius family history
 Straight betting / Automatic Totalisators Ltd – trade catalogue featuring Australian installations of Julius' automatic totalisator for racecourse betting
 The World's First Large-Scale, Multi-User, Real Time System.
 Was George Julius the inspiration for CSIRAC, Australia's first electronic digital computer?
 A few stories and history of my early years as a Mechanic, on the old ATL Melbourne Tote (Australia Circa 1976+)
 Julius' totalizator is presented and explained in 

1873 births
1946 deaths
Australian Knights Bachelor
English emigrants to New Zealand
English emigrants to Australia
English engineers
20th-century Australian inventors
Australian mechanical engineers
New Zealand mechanical engineers
20th-century New Zealand inventors
New Zealand knights
Engineers from Norwich
University of Canterbury alumni
20th-century New Zealand engineers
CSIRO people
George